Quốc Tử Giám can refer to:

 Imperial Academy, Huế
 Temple of Literature, Hanoi
 Vietnamese reading of the characters in Guozijian